Grylloblattidae, commonly known as the icebugs, or ice crawlers, is a family of extremophile (psychrophile) and wingless insects that live in the cold on top of mountains and the edges of glaciers. They belong, along with Mantophasmatidae (rock crawlers), to the order Notoptera. Grylloblattids are wingless insects mostly less than 3 cm long, with a head resembling that of a cockroach, with long antennae and having elongated cerci arising from the tip of their abdomen. They cannot tolerate warmth (most species will die at 10 °C) and many species have small distribution ranges.

Overview
Grylloblattids, ice crawlers or icebugs puzzled the scientists who discovered them in 1914, E.M. Walker and T.B. Kurata; the first species named was Grylloblatta campodeiformis, which means "cricket-cockroach shaped like a Campodea" (a kind of two-pronged bristletail). Most are nocturnal and appear to feed on detritus. They have long antennae (23–45 segments) and long cerci (5–8 segments), but no wings. Their eyes are either missing or reduced and they have no ocelli (simple eyes). Their closest living relatives are the recently discovered Mantophasmatodea. Most species are less than 3 cm long, the largest being Namkungia magnus.

The family has its own suborder, Grylloblattodea (formerly its own order). It contains 5 genera and about 34 extant species.

Most species have restricted distributions and small populations and with increased warming their habitats are threatened, making them endangered. In North America some species like Grylloblatta barberi and G. oregonensis are known from single sites.

Habitat and distribution
Grylloblattodea are nocturnal extremophiles typically found in leaf litter and under stones in extremely cold environments, usually at higher elevations. They are known to inhabit cold temperate forests to glaciers and the edges of ice sheets. Their optimal living temperature is between 1-4 °C (33.8-39.2 °F). They can be killed at colder temperatures due to ice formation in the body, so when the temperature drops below their optimal range they survive by living under snow pack near the soil. They have a very narrow range of temperatures that they prefer and cannot withstand high temperatures; many species are killed when the temperature rises about 5°C above their optimal temperature. They move in response to the seasons so as to maintain an optimal temperature in their foraging habitat. 

Grylloblattidae are patchily distributed in glaciers, caves, montane environments, and occasionally also lower-elevation forests in western North America, East Asia (Korea and Japan), Central Asia (Siberia, China, and Kazakhstan). They are predicted to occur in several other mountain chains in Asia, including parts of the Himalayas.

Diet
They are omnivorous, but feed primarily on dead arthropods and carrion. When arthropod carcasses are scarce, their diet relies heavily on plant material. The fossil species Plesioblattogryllus magnificus from the Middle Jurassic had strong mandibles and is thought to have been a predator.

Evolution
Grylloblattidae is generally thought to have emerged from within the "Grylloblattida", a poorly defined group of extinct winged insects that first appeared in the Late Carboniferous.

Taxonomy
List of Grylloblattodea genera and species along with their type localities:

Galloisiana Caudell & King 1924 – Far East Asia
Galloisiana chujoi Gurney 1961 – type locality: Oninoiwaya Cave, Japan
Galloisiana kiyosawai Asahina 1959 – type locality: Hirayu-Onsen, Japan
Galloisiana kosuensis Namkung 1974 – type locality: Gosu Cave, South Korea
Galloisiana nipponensis Caudell & King 1924 – type locality: Lake Chūzenji, Japan
Galloisiana notabilis Silvestri 1927 – type locality: Nagasaki Prefecture, Japan
Galloisiana odaesanensis Kim & Lee 2007 – type locality: Mount Odae, South Korea
Galloisiana olgae Vrsansky & Storozhenko 2001 – type locality: Mount Olga, Russia
Galloisiana sinensis Wang 1987 – type locality: Changbaishan, Jilin, PR China
Galloisiana sofiae Szeptycki 1987 – type locality: Mount Myoyang, South Korea
Galloisiana ussuriensis Storozhenko 1988 – type locality: Primorsky Krai, Russia
Galloisiana yezoensis Asahina 1961 – type locality: Miyazaki-Toge, Japan
Galloisiana yuasai Asahina 1959 – type locality: Tokugo-Toge, Japan
Grylloblatta Walker 1914 – western North America
Grylloblatta barberi Caudell 1924 – type locality: Sunny Side Mine, Mount Lassen area, California, USA
Grylloblatta bifratrilecta Gurney 1953 – type locality: Sonora Pass, California, USA
Grylloblatta campodeiformis Walker 1914 – type locality: Sulphur Mountain, Alberta, Canada
Grylloblatta chandleri Kamp 1963 – type locality: Eagle Lake, California, USA
Grylloblatta chintimini Marshall & Lytle 2015 – type locality: Marys Peak, Oregon, USA
Grylloblatta chirurgica Gurney 1961 – type locality: Ape Cave, Washington, USA
Grylloblatta gurneyi Kamp 1963 – type locality: Lava Beds National Monument, California, USA
Grylloblatta marmoreus Schoville 2012 – type locality: Marble Mountains, California, USA
Grylloblatta newberryensis Marshall & Lytle 2015 – type locality: Newberry Volcano, Oregon, USA
Grylloblatta oregonensis Schoville 2012 – type locality: Oregon Caves National Monument, USA
Grylloblatta rothi Gurney 1953 – type locality: Happy Valley, Deschutes County, Oregon, USA
Grylloblatta scudderi Kamp 1979 – type locality: Mount Paul, Alberta, Canada
Grylloblatta sculleni Gurney 1937 – type locality: Scott Camp, Deschutes County, Oregon, USA
Grylloblatta siskiyouensis Schoville 2012 – type locality: Oregon Caves National Monument, USA
Grylloblatta washoa Gurney 1961 – type locality: Echo Summit, California, USA
Grylloblattella Storozhenko 1988 – Central Asia
Grylloblattella cheni Bai, Wang & Yang 2010 – type locality: Ake Kule Lake, Xinjiang, China
Grylloblattella pravdini Storozhenko & Oliger 1984 – type locality: Teletskoye Lake, Russia
Grylloblattella sayanensis Storozhenko 1996 – type locality: Sambyl Pass, Russia
Grylloblattina Bey-Bienko 1951 – Far East Asia
Grylloblattina djakonovi Bey-Bienko 1951
Namkungia Storozhenko & Park 2002 – Korea
Namkungia biryongensis (Namkung 1974) – type locality: Biryong Cave, South Korea
Namkungia magna (Namkung 1986) – type locality: Balgudeok Cave, South Korea

In total, there are 33 extant species and 5 extant genera described as of 2015.

References

External links

Video of a walking grylloblattid in the Three Sisters Wilderness of Oregon

 
Insect families
Psychrophiles
Extant Triassic first appearances
Taxa named by Edmund Murton Walker